Panthays form a group of Chinese Muslims in Burma. Some people refer to Panthays as the oldest group of Muslims in Burma. The exact proportion of the Chinese Muslim group in the local Chinese population remains unknown due to a lack of data. However, they are concentrated particularly in the northern part of Burma which is historically closer to China's Yunnan province where Panthays originated.

Etymology
Panthay is a term used to refer to the predominantly Muslim Hui people of China who migrated to Burma. They are among the largest groups of Burmese Chinese, and predominantly reside in the northern regions of Burma (formerly known as Upper Burma), particularly in the Tangyan-Maymyo-Mandalay-Taunggyi area and Shan States.

The name Panthay is a Burmese word, which is said to be identical with the Shan word Pang hse. It was the name by which the Burmese called the Chinese Muslims who came with caravans to Burma from the Chinese province of Yunnan. The name was not used or known in Yunnan itself. The predominant Muslim ethnic group living in Yunnan are the Hui (回族) and refer to themselves as Hui or Huihui, but never Panthay.

Several theories are suggested as to its derivation, but none of them is strong enough to refute the others. The Burmese word Pathi is a corruption of Persian. The Burmese of Old Burma called their own indigenous Muslims Pathi. It was applied to all Muslims other than the Chinese Muslims. The name Panthay is still applied exclusively to the Chinese Muslims. However Chinese Muslims in Yunnan did not call themselves Panthay. They called themselves Huizu (回族), meaning Muslim in Chinese. Non-Muslim Chinese and Westerners refer to them as Huihui (回回).

Insofar as can be ascertained, the application of the term "Panthay" to Yunnanese Muslims (and, subsequently, to Burmese Muslims of Yunnanese origin) dates from about this time; certainly it was widely employed by British travelers and diplomats in the region from about 1875, and seems to have arisen as a corruption of the Burmese word pa-the meaning simply "Muslim". A considerable body of literature exists surrounding the etymology of this term, but the definitive notice (which remains, as yet, unpublished); indicated that it was introduced by Sladen at the time of his 1868 expedition to Teng-yueh, and that it represents an anglicised and shortened version of the Burmese tarup pase, or "Chinese Muslim".

In fact, the term "Panthay" was never employed by the Yunnanese Muslims (whether of China or of Burma) who prefer simply to call themselves Hui-min or Hui-hui; nor did it, apparently, enjoy widespread usage amongst the Burmese, Shan, Karen or other Burmese peoples. Be that as it may, however – and according to some the designation is virtually unused within Burma today - the term "Panthay" achieved widespread usage during the period of British rule, and remains the name by which Burma's Chinese Muslim community has generally been distinguished in English language sources to this day.

The origin of Panthay as documented in a book named "Panthay History" written by Ming Kuan-Shih (明光熙) while he was alive in Maymyo as: the families of some loyal lieutenants led by Mah Lin-Gi (馬靈驥) of the reputable late Hui General Du Wenxiu (杜文秀; pinyin: Dù Wénxiù) (1823–1872), who led those perilous fights against the Qing Empire jointly with its Christian ally Taipin-Tienkuo failed, and to escape from massacre by the Qing Empire, they had no choice but had to flee to Burma for refuge.

Settled in Wa region at Northern Shan State, Ma Lin-Gi divorced his wife of surname Yuan and married a widow of surname Ting. They later had two sons, the elder named Mah Mei-Ting (馬美廷) born in 1878 and the second son named Mah Shen-Ting (馬陞廷) born in 1879. The older son later became the leader of the Panthay community there.

Culture

Eager to establish close and friendly relations with all the neighboring states, the Sultan Suleiman of Yunnan wasted no time in seizing the opportunity of having a Chinese Muslim mosque installed at the Burmese King's capital. He at once sent out Colonel Mah Too-tu, one of his senior military officers, as his special envoy and agent to Mandalay with the important mission of constructing the mosque. The mosque took about two years to finish and was opened in 1868, the second mosque to be built in the royal capital. Today, 134 years later, the Panthay Mosque is still standing as the second oldest mosque in Mandalay.

History

Early history

Chinese-speaking, and of predominantly Han Chinese ethnic origin, this little-known group of Sunni Muslims of the Hanafi madhhab forms a predominantly endogamous, closely inter-related minority group in four countries – China, Burma, Thailand , Laos,  – and today represents both Islamic and Chinese cultures in northern Southeast Asia.

Commercial and cultural contacts between the Yunnan–Guizhou Plateau and the Irrawaddy Delta and lower Salween River probably predate significant migration by Han Chinese or Bamar populations into either area; certainly it is likely that by the time of the Eastern Han dynasty  (25-220 CE), itinerant traders and Buddhist pilgrims traversed this marginal region of the Sino-Indian cultural frontier on a regular if infrequent basis. By early Tang times, Chinese control over western Yunnan was established for the first time with the submission of the population of the Erhai Lake region near Dali City in 672 and the extension of the Imperial Mandate to the region of the present-day Yunnan-Burma frontier some twenty-two later, in 694. This Han Chinese dominance was to be short-lived, however; within forty-five years – about 738 – the Yi state of Nanzhao had emerged as the dominant power of the Yunnan-Burma frontier region, a position which both it and its successor, the Dali Kingdom, were to hold until the Mongol conquest of the region five centuries later.

Despite the political independence of Nanzhao, Chinese cultural influence continued to penetrate and influence the Yunnan-Burma frontier region throughout the Tang and Song dynasties. Moreover, it is possible that during the mid-Tang period – in about 801 –  surrendered Muslim soldiers, described in the Chinese Annals as the Hēiyī Dàshí ("Black-clad Tay'ī, a term referring to the black flags of the Abbasid Caliphate) were first settle in Yunnan.

Whilst this early settlement remains in some doubt, however, it is at least certain that Muslims of Central Asian origin played a major role in the Yuan conquest and subsequent rule of Southwest China, as a result of which a distinct Muslim community was established in Yunnan by the late 13th century. Foremost amongst these soldier-administrators was Sayyid Ajjal Shams al-Din Omar, a court official and general of Turkic origin who participated in the Mongol invasion of Sichuan and Yunnan in c. 1252, and who became Yuan Governor of the latter province in 1274–79. Hisson Nasir-al-Din was in charge of the road systems of Yunnan and personally commanded the first Mongol invasion of Bagan in 1277–78. And his younger brother Hushin (Husayn) was Transport Commissioner in 1284 and later Senior Governor of Yunnan. Shams al-Din – who is widely believed by the Muslims of Yunnan to have introduced Islam to the region – is represented as a wise and benevolent ruler, who successfully "pacified and comforted" the people of Yunnan, and who is credited with building temples of Confucius as well as mosques and schools. On his death he was succeeded by his eldest son, Nasir al-Din (the "Nescradin" of Marco Polo), who governed Yunnan from 1279-84.

During Shams al-Din's governorship of Yunnan, Nasir al-Din was first appointed Commissioner of Roads for the province and then, in 1277–8, appointed to command the first Mongol invasion of Burma. Leading to the overthrow of the Pagan Dynasty. Subsequently, during Nasir al-Din's governorship, his younger brother Husayn (the third son of Sayyid al-Ajal Shams al-Din) was appointed Transport Commissioner for the province. As a result of the pre-eminence of Shams al-Din and his family during this period, a significant number of Muslim soldiers of Central Asian origin were transferred to the Dali region of western Yunnan – an area still largely unpopulated by Han Chinese settlers – and the descendants of these garrison troops, who participated in a number of Mongol invasions of Burmese territory during the Yuan period, form the nucleus of the present-day Chinese Muslim population both in Yunnan and Burma.

Over the next five hundred years this nascent Yunnanese Muslim community established itself in a position of economic and demographic strength in southern and western Yunnan – though there are few indications of significant settlement in Burmese territory before Qing times and acquired a distinctive ethnic identity through intermarriage with the local population, a process paralleled in areas of Muslim settlement elsewhere in China. Thus, following the demise of the Abbasids in 1258 and the related rise of the Mongols in China, the term Dashi (as applied loosely both to foreign Muslims and to those settled within China) disappeared from the Chinese Annals and was gradually replaced by a new term, Hui or Huihui, giving rise in turn to the modern Chinese term Huizu, the recognised contemporary designation for China's Chinese-speaking Muslim minority.

Muslim Settlement of Yunnan
Within Yunnan, the Hui Muslim population seems to have flourished and expanded throughout the Yuan and Ming periods (c. 1280–1644). Certainly when Marco Polo visited Yunnan in the early Yuan, he noted the presence of "Saracens" amongst the population, whilst the Persian historian Rashid-al-Din Hamadani (died 1318) recorded in the Jami' al-tawarikh that "the great city of Yachi" in Yunnan was exclusively inhabited by Muslims. Rashid al-Din may have been referring to the region around Dali in western Yunnan, which was to emerge as the earliest centre of Hui settlement in the province, though other areas of significant Muslim settlement were subsequently established in north-western Yunnan around Chao-t'ung by the Emperor Jen-tsung in about 1313 as well as – much later on, during the Qing Dynasty – in and around Qianshui in southeastern Yunnan.

The history of the Panthays in Burma was inseparably linked to that of Yunnan, their place of origin, whose population was predominantly Muslim. The Chinese Muslims of Yunnan were noted for their mercantile prowess. Within Yunnan, the Muslim population excelled as merchants and soldiers, the two qualities, which made them ideally suited to the rigors of overland trade in the rugged, mountainous regions, and to deserve the rewards therefrom. They might have been helped in this by their religion of' Islam from its inception had flourished as a Religion of Trade. The religious requirement to perform Hajj pilgrimage had also helped them to establish an overland road between Yunnan and Arabia as early as the first half of the 14th century.

During the first decades of the 19th century, population pressures on the Hui Muslim and other minority peoples of Yunnan increased substantially as a result of Han Chinese migration to the province. Resentment against this development, coupled with mounting hostility towards Qing rule, led in 1855 to the Panthay Rebellion among Muslim miners in the Qianshui region. Within two years, however, the center of rebellion had spread to the west of the province under the leadership of Du Wenxiu. For the next fifteen years, until the Qing reconquest, Dali remained the capital of the "Country of the peaceful South", where Du erected a Forbidden City, wore Ming hanfu in repudiation of Qing authority, and is reported by some sources to have adopted the Muslim name and title "Sultan Sulayman".

Panthay rebellion in Yunnan

Several uprisings involving Hui and Han such as the Dungan Revolt (1862–77) and the Panthay Rebellion broke out in several regions of China. The unfavorable discrimination with which the Hui were treated by the Han and by the imperial administration was at the root of their rebellions. The Panthay Rebellion began out of a conflict between Han and Hui tin miners in 1853, which degenerated into rebellion. In the following year, a massacre of Hui was organized by local Qing officials in Yunnan responsible for suppressing the revolt. One of the leaders of the insurrection was the scholar Yusuf Ma Dexin. Anxious to increase his own influence, Yusuf Ma Dexin finally agreed to submit to the Qing in 1861. He was succeeded by Du Wenxiu (1823–72), a Hui born in Yongcheng. Du Wenxiu's father was a Han who converted to Islam.

Starting from 1855 the Hui of Yunnan had risen against the oppression to which they were subjected by the mandarins. They rose against the tyranny and extortion universally practiced by this official class, from which they were excluded. The mandarins had secretly hounded mobs on to the rich Panthays, provoked anti-Hui riots and instigated destruction of their mosques. The revolt was not religious in nature, since the Muslims were joined by non-Muslim Shan and Kachin people and other hill tribes in the revolt. A British officer testified that the Muslims did not rebel for religious reasons and that the Chinese were tolerant of different religions and were unlikely to have caused the revolt by interfering with the practicing of Islam.  In addition, loyalist Muslim forces helped Qing crush the rebel Muslims.

The rebellion started as a local uprising. It was sparked off by the Panthay laborers of the silver mines of Lin'an village in Yunnan who rose up against the Qing. The Chinese Governor of Yunnan sent an urgent appeal to the central government in Beijing. The Imperial Government was handicapped by problems that cropped up in profusion in various parts of the sprawling empire.

They repulsed the desultory attacks of the imperial troops. They wrested one important city after another from the hands of' the Imperial mandarins. The Chinese towns and villages which resisters were pillaged, and the male population massacred. All the places, which yielded, were spared. The ancient holy city of Dali fell to the Panthays in 1857. With the capture of Dali, Muslim supremacy became an established fact in Yunnan.

Du Wenxiu was originally not aiming his rebellion at Han, but was anti-Qing and wanted to destroy the Manchu government. During the revolt Hui from provinces which were not in rebellion, like Sichuan and Zhejiang, served as negotiators between rebel Hui and the Qing government. One of Du Wenxiu's banners said "Deprive the Manchu Qing of their Mandate to Rule" (革命滿清), and he called on Han to assist Hui to overthrow the Manchu regime and drive them out of China. Du's forces led multiple non-Muslim forces, including Han-Chinese, Li, Bai, and Hani. Du Wenxiu also called for unity between Muslim Hui and Han. He was quoted as saying "our army has three tasks: to drive out the Manchus, unite with the Chinese, and drive out traitors." Du Wenxiu did not blame Han, but blamed the tensions on the Manchu regime, saying that they were foreign to China and alienated the Chinese and other minorities. Du Wenxiu also called for the complete expulsion of Manchus from all of China in order for China to once again come under Chinese rule. Total war was waged against Manchu rule. Du Wenxiu refused to surrender, unlike the other rebel Muslim commander, Ma Rulong. This may have had something to do with the sects of Islam practiced among the rebels. The Gedimu Hanafi Sunni Muslims under Ma Rulong readily defected to Qing, while the Jahriyya Sufi Muslims did not surrender. Some of the Jahriyya rebels in the Panthay Rebellion like Ma Shenglin were related to the Dungan revolt Jahriyya leader Ma Hualong and maintained contact with them.

The "Islamic Kingdom of Yunnan" was proclaimed after the fall of Tali-fu (Dali City). Du Wenxiu, leader of the Panthays, assumed the regnal title of Sultan Suleiman and made Tali-fu his capital. In this way, the Sultanate, fashioned after those of' the Middle East, appeared in Yunnan. Panthay governorships were also created in a few important cities, such as Momein (Tengyueh), which were a few stages from the Burmese border town of Bhamo. The Panthays reached the highwater mark of their power and glory in 1860.

The eight years from 1860 to 1868 were the heyday of the Sultanate. The Panthays had either taken or destroyed forty towns and one hundred villages. During this period the Sultan Suleiman, on his way to Mecca as a pilgrim, visited Rangoon, presumably via the Kengtung route, and from there to Calcutta where he had a chance to see the power of the British colonists.

The Panthay power declined after 1868. The Chinese Imperial Government had succeeded in reinvigorating itself. By 1871, it was directing a campaign for the annihilation of the obdurate Panthays of Yunnan. By degrees the Imperial Government had tightened the cordon around the Panthays. The Panthay Kingdom proved unstable as soon as the Imperial Government made a regular and determined attack on it. Town after town fell under well-organized attacks made by the imperial troops. Tali-fu itself was besieged by the imperial Chinese. Sultan Suleiman found himself caged in by the walls of his capital. He now desperately looked for outside help. He turned to the British colonists for military assistance. He imagined that only British military intervention could have saved the Panthays.

The Sultan had reasons for his turning to the British colonists for military aid. He had seen the British might in India on his pilgrimage to Mecca some years earlier, and was impressed by it. Britain was the only western power with whom the Sultanate was on friendly terms and had contacts with. The British authorities in India and British Burma had sent a mission led by Major Sladen to Momien from May to July 1868. The Sladen mission had stayed seven weeks at Momien. The main purpose of the mission was to revive the Ambassador Route between Bhamo and Yunnan and resuscitate border trade, which had almost ceased since 1855 mainly because of the Panthay rebellion.

Taking advantage of the friendly relations resulting from Sladen's visit, Sultan Suleiman now, in his fight for the survival of the Panthay Kingdom, turned to the British for the vitally, needed military assistance. In 1872 he sent his adopted son Prince Hassan, to England, with a personal letter to Queen Victoria, via Burma, requesting British military assistance. The Hassan Mission was accorded courtesy and hospitality in both British Burma and England. However, the British colonists refused to intervene militarily in Yunnan against Peking. The mission was a failure. While Hassan and his party were abroad, Tali-fu was captured by the Imperial troops in January 1873.

The Imperial Government had waged an all-out war against the Panthays with the help of French artillery experts. Their modern equipment, trained personnel and numerical superiority were no match for the ill-equipped Panthays with no allies. Thus, in less than two decades of its rise, the power of the Panthays in Yunnan fell. But the Chinese suffered the loss of more than 20,000 lives in various fights. Seeing no escape and no mercy from his relentless foe, Sultan Suleiman tried to take his own life before the fall of' Tali-fu. But, before the poison he drank took effect fully, he was beheaded by his enemies. The Sultan's head was preserved in honey and then dispatched to the Imperial Court in Peking as a trophy and a testimony to the decisive nature of the victory of the Imperial Chinese over the Pantliays of Yunnan.

The scattered remnants of the Panthay troops continue their resistance after the fall of Tali-fu. But when Momien was next besieged and stormed by the imperial troops in May 1873, their resistance broke completely. Governor Ta-sa-kon was captured and executed by the order of the Imperial Government.

Many adherents to the Panthay cause were persecuted by the imperial mandarins.  Many Panthays thus fled with their families across the Burmese border and took refuge in the Wa State where, about 1875, they set up the exclusively Panthay town of Panglong.

For a period of perhaps ten to fifteen years following the collapse of the Yunnan Muslim Rebellion, the province's Hui minority was widely discriminated against by the victorious Qing, especially in the western frontier districts contiguous with Burma. During these years the refugee Hui settled across the frontier within Burma gradually established themselves in their traditional callings – as merchants, caravaneers, miners, restaurateurs and (for those who chose or were forced to live beyond the law) as smugglers and mercenaries.

At least 15 years after the collapse of the Yunnan Muslim Rebellion, the original Panthay settlements had grown to include numbers of Shan and other hill peoples.

Panthays during Konbaung period
Beginning from the late Konbaung period, the Panthays started to settle in the royal capital of Mandalay, particularly during the reign of King Mindon. Although their number was small, a few of them seemed to have found their way inside the court as jade-assessors. They lived side by side with non-Muslim Chinese at Chinatowns (tayoke tan), which had been designated by King Mindon as the residential area for the Chinese. The non-Muslim Chinese had started settling in Mandalay considerably earlier than the Panthays so that by the time the latter arrived, there already was a Chinese community at Mandalay, with their own bank, companies and warehouses and some kind of organized social and economic life.

It happened that there were also Chinese jade-assessors in the employ of the king. Rivalry between the Chinese and Panthay jade-assessors in courting the royal favor naturally led to a quarrel between the two groups, resulting in a number of deaths. King Mindon had not given much serious thought to the religious and social differences between the Panthays and the Chinese. He had treated the two more or less alike. But after the Chinadown quarrel, the king began to see the wisdom of separating the two groups.

King Mindon and Panthays
 
It was also during this time that King Mindon granted the Panthays of the royal capital land on which to settle as a separate community, with a view to preventing further quarrels between them and the Chinese. The Panthays were given the rare favor of choosing their own place of residence within the confines of the royal capital, and they chose the site on which the present-day Panthay Compound (Chinese Muslim Quarter) is located. It was bounded on the north by 35th Street, in the south by 36th Street, in the east by 79th Street and in the west by 80th Street. This site was chosen because it was the camping ground for the mule caravans from Yunnan, which regularly came to the capital via the Theinni route.

The broadminded King Mindon also permitted a mosque to be built on the granted site so that the Panthays would have their own place of worship. Having no funds for an undertaking of such magnitude, the Panthays of Mandalay put up the matter to the Sultan of Yunnan. Sultan Sulaiman had already started a business enterprise (hao) in Mandalay.

His company was housed in a one-story brick building located at the present-day Taryedan on the west side of the 80th Street, between 36th and 37th Streets. The hao had been carrying on business in precious stones, jades, cotton, silk and other commodities of both Chinese and Burmese origins.

Diaspora

The demise of the Sultanate had shattered the hopes of all the Panthays for their own Islamic kingdom in Yunnan. The blood-bath that occurred in its wake had made the decision for many Panthays: to flee the country for those who could make it, and not to return to Yunnan for those who were already outside. Colonel Mah Too-tu found himself in the same situation. When the Sultanate fell, Mah Too-tu was stranded at Mandalay. For a man of his rank and stature, going back to Tali-fu meant sure execution by the Manchu authorities. Mah Too-tu had no other alternative but to settle down in Mandalay. In November 1868 he had bought a plot of land with a house on it for 80 pieces of one-kyat coins from Khunit Ywa-sa Princess. On 7 June 1873, Mah Too-tu married Shwe Gwe, a lady from Sagyin-wa village near Amarapura, who happened to be the daughter of a princess of Manipur brought to Mandalay as a captive by the Burmese king. Mah Too-tu spent the last years of his life at the Panthay Compound with his Burmese wife.

After the mass exodus from Yunnan, the number of Panthays residing in Mandalay gradually increased. The new arrivals, usually families, came by way of Bhamo or via the Wa State. When the land for the Panthays was granted by King Mindon, there were a few houses on it, in addition to several old graves. This shows that the place had been an abandoned graveyard. In the years immediately following the completion of the mosque, the number of houses in the Panthay Compound was less than twenty. There were also between ten and twenty Panthay households living in other parts of Mandalay. But a trickle of new arrivals added to their number.

The establishment of the Panthay Mosque in 1868 marked the emergence of the Chinese Muslims as a distinct community at Mandalay. Although the number of this first generation of Panthays remained small, the Mosque, which is still standing, constitutes a historic landmark. It signifies the beginning of the first Panthay Jama'at (Congregation) in Mandalay Ratanabon Naypyidaw.

Early 20th century

Over the next thirty or so years the Panthays of Panglong continues to prosper, though by the early 1920s a feud had begun to develop between them and the Was of neighbouring Pankawn. In 1926 this erupted into the local "Wa Panthay War", in which the latter were victorious and as a result of which Panglong threw off its vassalage to Pangkawn and reinforced its dominance over the trade routes of the region31. In addition to legitimate trading, by this time the Panthays, of Panglong were securely established as 'the aristocrats of the opium business' in the region now commonly designated the Golden Triangle, leaving the Petty and risky business of peddlings this highly profitable commodity locally to Shan and Han Chinese dealers, and instead running large, well-armed caravans in long-distance convoys far into Siam, Laos, Tonking and Yunnan. When Harvey visited Panglong in 1931 he found that Panthay numbers had risen to 5,000 ('including local recruits'), that they were financed by Singaporean Chinese, had 130 mauser rifles with 1,500 mules, and exported opium by the hundredweight into French, Siamese and British territory, each muleload escorted by two riflemen.

Meanwhile, despite the relative importance of Panglong and the profits to be made from the long-distance caravan, other Panthays moved further into Burma, initially as miners anxious to exploit the ruby mines of Mogok; the Baldwin silver mines of Namtu in the Northern Shan State, the jade mines of Mogaung in Kachin State. Numbers of Panthay restaurateurs and innkeepers, merchants and traders settled in the urban centres of upland Burma – chiefly at Lashio, Kengtung, Bhamo and Taunggyi – to service the needs of these miners, passing caravaneers and the local inhabitants, whilst other settlements largely devoted to trade with the indigenous Shan and Karen populations sprang up along the Salween River. Finally, other Panthay elements moved to the major urban centres of the Burmese lowlands, most notably to Mandalay and Rangoon, where they flourished as merchants and representatives of their up – country fellows, as well as middle-men between Panglong and the other "Overland Chinese" settlements of Upper Burma and the "Overseas Chinese" community of the lowland port-cities. Bassein and Moulmein must also have attracted some Panthay settlement, the latter port being a terminus of the overland caravan trade from Yunnan in its own right, via the northern Thai trade route through Kengtung, Chiang Mai and Mae Sariang.

During the greater part of the period of British rule in Burma these Panthay settlers flourished, specialising in all levels of commerce from the international gem markets to shop – and inn-keeping, mule-breeding and peddling or hawking – indeed Yunnanese peddlars (who may or may not have been Muslim) even penetrated into the unadministered and inaccessible hill tracts of "The Triangle" between Mali Hka and Nmai Hka, to the north of Myitkyina. Chiefly, however, beyond the urban centres of the Burmese lowlands, the Panthays continued their involvement in the caravan trade with Yunnan, transporting silk, tea, metal goods and foodstuffs (eggs, fruit, nut and even the renowned Yunnanese hams (doubtless for consumption by their Han fellow countrymen)) from China to Burma, and carrying back European manufactured goods, broadcloths, specialised foodstuffs (edible birds nests, sea slugs) and above all raw cotton, to Yunnan.

In 1931 Harvey estimated the population of Panglong (which was predominantly Panthay) at 5,000 persons. Yet official estimates put the Panthay population of Burma at 2,202 for 1911 (1,427 males and 775 females), whilst by the 1921 Census of India this had declined to 1,517 (1,076 males and 441 females), and by 1931 to 1,106 (685 males and 421 females).

World War II and independence
A Census for 1941 was never taken, being interrupted by World War II and the Japanese invasion; indeed, it was as a result of the Japanese invasion the main Panthay settlement at Panglong was destroyed, and many Panthay fled to Yunnan, or crossed the largely unpoliced jungle frontiers into Thailand and Laos to escape Japanese persecution. The traditional dominance of Panthay in the trade of the Burma-Yunnan frontier region was also set back by the construction of the Burma Road between Lashio and Kunming in 1937–38, and by the exodus of thousands of Yunnanese refugees and Kuomintang troops following the seizure of power by the Chinese Communists in 1949. As a result of these developments, which brought a flood of predominantly Han, and not Hui, "Overland Chinese" to the Burmese Shan States, many Panthay seem to have chosen to migrate to northern Thailand, where their communities continue to flourish.

Panglong, a Chinese Muslim town in British Burma, was entirely destroyed by the Japanese invaders in the Japanese invasion of Burma. The Hui Ma Guanggui became the leader of the Hui Panglong self defense guard created by Su who was sent by the Kuomintang government of the Republic of China to fight against the Japanese invasion of Panglong in 1942. The Japanese destroyed Panglong, burning it and driving out the over 200 Hui households out as refugees. Yunnan and Kokang received Hui refugees from Panglong driven out by the Japanese. One of Ma Guanggui's nephews was Ma Yeye, a son of Ma Guanghua and he narrated the history of Panglang included the Japanese attack. An account of the Japanese attack on the Hui in Panglong was written and published in 1998 by a Hui from Panglong called "Panglong Booklet". The Japanese attack in Burma caused the Hui Mu family to seek refuge in Panglong but they were driven out again to Yunnan from Panglong when the Japanese attacked Panglong.

No comprehensive census of the remaining Panthay population within Burma has been taken since 1931, and restrictions on travel for foreigners, combined with the inherent weakness of central government control over those outlying areas of the Shan and Kachin Hills where many Panthays live, makes any attempt to calculate Burma's present (1986) Panthay population almost impossible (though an exaggerated estimate of 100,000 Panthays resident within Burma appeared in the Burmese daily Hanthawaddi in 1960). Certainly readily identifiable Panthay communities continue to exist in several areas which are open to foreign travel (Rangoon, Mandalay, Taunggyi), as well as, by report, in Kengtung, Bhamo, Mogok, Lashio and at Tanyan, near Lashio. Wherever they have settled in sufficient numbers, the Panthays have established their own mosques and madrasas (for example the Panthay Balee at Mandalay Short Lane, Rangoon, at Mandalay and in Myitkyina). Some of these mosques are in "pseudo-Moghul" style, clearly having been influenced by Indian Muslim tastes and styles, whilst others (notably at Mandalay) have Chinese architectural features. As with the Hui in China, the Burmese Panthay are exclusively Hanafi; few are conversant with more than the most elementary phrases of Arabic, and quite often when a Panthay imam is not available to care for the spiritual welfare of a community, a South Asian and Zerbadi Muslim is engaged instead. Zerbadi Muslims are descendent community of intermarriages between foreign Muslim (South Asian and Middle Eastern) males and Burmese females.

Present Panthays in Burma
Panthays are spread over many parts of Burma with their mosques in Yangon, Taungyi, Lashio, Tangyang, Kyaington, Pyin-Oo-Lwin, Myitkyina Mogok and Muse.

Panthay caravaners
In the pre-colonial times the Panthays emerged as excellent long-distance caravaneers of southern China and northern Southeast Asia. They had virtually dominated whole caravan trade of Yunnan. By the time the first agents and adventurous pioneers the French and British imperialism arrived at the fringes of Yunnan, they found the caravan network of the region dominated by the Chinese Muslim muleteers.

The Chinese Muslim domination of the Yunnan caravan network seems to have continued well into the 20th century. By the mid 19th century the caravans of' Yunnanese traders ranged over an area extending from the eastern frontiers of Tibet, through Assam, Burma, Thailand, Laos and Tongkin (presently part of Vietnam), to the southern Chinese provinces of Sichuan, Guizhou and Guangxi.

The merchandise brought from Yunnan by the Panthay caravaneers included silk cloth, tea, metal utensils, iron in the rough, felts, finished articles of' clothing, walnuts, opium, wax, preserved fruits and foods, and dried meat of' several kinds. The Burmese goods taken back to Yunnan were raw cotton, raw and wrought silk, amber, jades and other precious stones, velvets, betel-nuts, tobacco, gold-leaf', preserves, paps, dye woods, stick lac, ivory, and specialized foodstuffs such as slugs, edible birds’ nests, among other things. Raw cotton, which was reserved as a royal monopoly, was in great demand in China. An extensive trade in this commodity had existed between the Burmese kingdom and Yunnan. It was transported up the Ayeyarwaddy River to Bhamo where it was sold to the Chinese merchants, and conveyed partly by land and partly by water into Yunnan, and from there to other provinces of China. Most caravans consisted of between fifty and one hundred mules, employing ten to fifteen drivers.

A reason for the cessation of trade by the Bhamo routes was due to King Mindon's earlier policy of confining the British to lower Burma. Mindon had feared that trade along the Bhamo route would lead to the extension of British influence to upper Burma and beyond. He did not want a fleet of British steamers to the north of the capital. He also seemed to be desirous of making Mandalay the center of trade instead of Bhamo which was difficult to control.

Later, this short-sighted policy and attitude of King Mindon gradually wore out as he began to see the practical economic and political advantages of the resuscitation of Bhamo trade to his country and people. Thus, he extended all the help he could to the Sladen mission. With the Burmese monarch favorably disposed towards it, the British mission was cordially received by the Panthay Governor of Momien, Ta-sa-kon. Due to lack of' security of the roads, Sladen was not allowed to proceed to Tali-fu to discuss matters directly with the Sultan. However, the Sultan sent letters to Momien in which he expressed the desire of the Panthay government to enter into friendly relations with the British government, and to foster mutual trade. Before returning, Sladen and the Momien Governor Ta-sa-kon, as the Sultan's personal representative, signed an agreement in which the British and the Panthays pledged to foster Yunnan-Burma trade to the best of their ability. Though far from being a satisfactory treaty to both parties, the agreement had established some kind of de facto friendship between them.

See also

 Islam in Burma
 Islam in China
 Islam in India
 Islam in Asia
 Burmese Indians
 Rohingya people
 Burmese Chinese
 Hui Chinese
 Chin Haw
 Panthay Rebellion
 Dungan people
 Burmese Malays

References

Further reading
 Anderson, John, Mandalay to Momien: A Narrative of the Two Expeditions to Western China of 1868 and 1875 (London: Macmillan, 1876).
 Ba Shin, Lt. Colonel, "Coming of Islam to Burma Down to 1700 AD.," Asian History Congress (New Delhi: Azad Bhavan, 1961).
 Forbes, Andrew D.W., "The Role of Hui Muslims in the Traditional Caravan Trade between Yunnan and Thailand," Asian Merchants and Businessmen in the Indian Ocean and the China sea: 13th-20th Centuries (French Journal published under the direction of Denys Lombard & Jean Aubin), (Paris: School of Higher Studies in Social Sciences, 1987).
 Forbes, Andrew; Henley, David (2011). Traders of the Golden Triangle. Chiang Mai: Cognoscenti Books. ASIN: B006GMID5K
 Kaye, J.W., Major Sladen's Report on the Bhamo Route, (In Continuation of' Parliamentary Paper No. 251, of Session 1868-9), (London: India Office, 1871), Microfilm copy.
 Scott, J. George, GUBSS, 1, i ( Rangoon Government Printing, 1900).
 Thaung, Dr., “Panthay Interlude in Yunnan: A Study in Vicissitudes Through the Burmese Kaleidoscope,” JBRS Fifth Anniversary Publications No. 1 (Rangoon Sarpy Beikman, 1961).
 Yule, Col. Henry & Burnell, A. C., Hobson-Jobson- A Glossary of Colloquial Anglo-Indian Words and Phrases, and of Kindred Terms, Etymological, Historical, Geographical And Discursive (Delhi-.Munshiran Manoharlal, 1968), Reprint.
 Than Tun, Dr. (Professor of History), History on Tour, 111, (In Burma) (Yangon Nantha House, August 1968).
 Parabaik dated 13 November 1868 containing a short account of' Mah Too-tu's purchase of land and house from Khunit Ywa-sa Princess (a family parabaik of the writer)..

External links
 

Chinese diaspora in Asia
Ethnic groups in Myanmar
Hui people
Muslim communities in Asia